Averoff or Averof is a Greek surname. It may refer to:
George Averoff (1815–1899), Greek businessman and philanthropist
Evangelos Averoff (1910 – 1990), Greek politician

See also
Greek cruiser Georgios Averof
Averoff Gallery

Greek-language surnames